North Castle is a town in Westchester County, New York, United States. The population was 11,841 at the 2010 census. It has three hamlets: Armonk, Banksville, and North White Plains.

Geography

Demographics

As of the census of 2000, there were 10,849 people, 3,583 households, and 3,002 families residing in the town.  The population density was 450.4 people per square mile (173.9/km2).  There were 3,706 housing units at an average density of 153.9 per square mile (59.4/km2).  The racial makeup of the town was 92.38% White, 1.76% African American, 0.03% Native American, 3.96% Asian, 0.05% Pacific Islander, 0.63% from other races, and 1.20% from two or more races. Hispanic or Latino of any race were 4.14% of the population.

There were 3,583 households, out of which 44.2% had children under the age of 18 living with them, 74.6% were married couples living together, 6.9% had a female householder with no husband present, and 16.2% were non-families. 13.1% of all households were made up of individuals, and 5.5% had someone living alone who was 65 years of age or older.  The average household size was 2.99 and the average family size was 3.28.

In the town, the population was spread out, with 29.7% under the age of 18, 4.5% from 18 to 24, 26.8% from 25 to 44, 28.3% from 45 to 64, and 10.7% who were 65 years of age or older.  The median age was 40 years. For every 100 females, there were 97.1 males.  For every 100 females age 18 and over, there were 94.7 males.

The median income for a household in the town was $117,815, and the median income for a family was $141,764. Males had a median income of $86,950 versus $49,500 for females. The per capita income for the town was $60,628.  About 1.0% of families and 3.0% of the population were below the poverty line, including 1.7% of those under age 18 and 3.4% of those age 65 or over.

Communities in North Castle 
North Castle has three distinct geographical areas, each taking the form of a hamlet.
 Armonk – a hamlet located in the central part of the town. It is the seat of town government and the main town library.
 Banksville – a hamlet, also known as the "Eastern District of North Castle", located in the eastern part of the town, close to Connecticut.
 North White Plains – a hamlet located in the southern part of the town. It is south of the Kensico Reservoir Dam, west of the White Plains Reservoirs, and east of the Bronx River, although the name generally refers to any portion of North Castle south of the Kensico Reservoir. The Elijah Miller House was added to the National Register of Historic Places in 1976.

Economy

Due to its proximity to Manhattan and its idyllic setting, a number of major companies call Armonk home. IBM has its world headquarters in Armonk. Its principal building, referred to as CHQ, is a 283,000-square-foot (26,300 m2) glass and stone edifice on a 25-acre (10 ha) parcel amid a 432-acre former apple orchard the company purchased in the mid-1950s. The American headquarters of Swiss Re is located in Armonk on a 127-acre site overlooking the Kensico Reservoir. In addition M.E. Sharpe, the academic publisher, also has its headquarters in Armonk.

Top employers
According to North Castle's 2011 Comprehensive Annual Financial Report, the top employers in the city are:

Election results
Supervisor - 2009
William Weaver (Republican, Independence, Conservative) - 1,648 - 46%
Frank Benish (Libertarian)                              - 990   - 27%
Becky Kittredge (Democrat)                              - 965   - 27%
 
Councilman - 2009
John J. Cronin (Republican, Independence, Conservative) - 2,311 - 35%
Diane Roth (Republican, Independence, Conservative)     - 1,800 - 27%
Bob Romano (Democrat)                                   - 1,437 - 22%
Stacey Slipe (Democrat)                                 - 1,118 - 17%

Supervisor - 2005
John Lombardi (Republican, Independence, Conservative) - 1,901 - 43%
Reese Berman (Democrat, Protect North Castle)          - 2,264 - 51%
Anthony Futia, Jr. (Libertarian)                       - 233   - 5%

Councilman - 2005
William Weaver (Republican, Independence, Conservative) - 2,089 - 26%
John Stipo (Republican, Independence)                   - 1,398 - 18%
Anthony Baratta (Democrat, Protect North Castle)        - 1,953 - 24%
Gerry Geist (Democrat, Conservative)                    - 2,548 - 32%

Supervisor - 2001
John Lombardi (Republican) - 2,950 - 100%

Supervisor - 1999
John Lombardi (Republican) - 1,562 - 100%

Supervisor - 1997
John Lombardi (Republican) - 2,827 - 100%

Supervisor - 1989
John Lombardi (Republican) - 2,126 - 74.21%
John Stipo (Integrity)     -   739 - 25.79%

Population growth (1800–2010) 
1800 – 1,168
1850 – 2,189
1900 – 1,471
1950 – 3,855
2000 – 10,849
2010 – 11,841

Population growth in North Castle reflects the pattern of rural to suburban development typical of the post-World War II years. Like many other suburban communities in Westchester County and the nation, the town experienced a surge of population growth between 1940 and 1970. The overall rate of growth was moderate between 1970 and 1990 because of national economic conditions, including the rising cost of land, construction and interest, which helped to bring about a general decline in housing construction. The median price of houses sold in North Castle in 1998 was approximately $600,000.

References

External links
Town of North Castle official website

Towns in Westchester County, New York
Towns in the New York metropolitan area